TheSword.com is a gay news and lifestyle website for coverage of the gay adult industry. Based in San Francisco, a large portion of The Sword's coverage is dedicated to covering the lives of gay porn stars in a tabloid fashion.  The Sword is owned by gay adult site NakedSword.com.

The site received plaudits from safer sex advocates after a Sword survey revealed that 30% of working gay porn stars were HIV positive. It has also campaigned for causes including the decriminalization of prostitution and the rights of transgender people. In 2009, The Sword gained national recognition from the Huffington Post and the San Francisco Chronicle after it reported on the state of California's decision not to train employees of adult websites. 

In 2010, The Sword received mainstream national media attention after then editor Zachary Sire reported that gay porn star named Brandon Wilde had been hired as an escort by Minnesota State Senator Paul Koering. With its sharp and reliable reporting on the adult industry, The Sword has become a fan favorite for porn news, culture and opinion, original content, and behind-the-scenes videos.

The Sword currently provides gay news to sites including GayToday.com, JustUsBoys.com, and AVN Online Magazine.

In February 2009, The Sword won Best Erotic E-Zine at the 2009 Cybersocket Awards in West Hollywood.

In September 2010, The Sword won Best Blog at the 2010 GayVN Awards.

References

Gay male pornography websites
Gay men's websites
American erotica and pornography websites